Calavance may refer to several kinds of edible dry bean or foods made from them:

 Hyacinth bean (most commonly)
 Chickpea, probably connected etymologically
 More generally, any bean